Tatyana Shlykova, also known by her stage name Granatova (1773-1863), was a Russian ballerina and opera singer.

She was the daughter of Vasily Shlykov and Elena Shlykova, serfs of count Peter Borisovich Sheremetev, and trained in manners, recitation, French, Italian, music, singing and dancing to act in the famous Sheremetev theatre of serfs, where she was enrolled as its first ballet dancer in 1780. She became a noted artist and performed in many leading ballet roles, both comic and dramatic, and was noted by empress Catherine the Great. She was freed in 1803.

References
 
 
 

1773 births
1863 deaths
18th-century actresses from the Russian Empire
Russian stage actresses
Ballerinas from the Russian Empire
Russian ballerinas
Russian operatic sopranos
Russian serfs
18th-century ballet dancers from the Russian Empire
19th-century ballet dancers from the Russian Empire